John Ruffo (born November 26, 1954) is an American former business executive, white-collar criminal and confidence man, who in 1998 was convicted in a scheme to defraud many US and foreign banking institutions of over 350 million US dollars. The swindle is considered one of the most significant cases of bank fraud in US history. He has been a fugitive from justice ever since, and is on the U.S. Marshals 15 Most Wanted Fugitives list.

Ruffo was the President of CCS, an IBM equipment reseller in New York City, in 1996.

Biography

Early life
Ruffo was born to a close-knit Italian American family in a working class neighborhood in Brooklyn. He attended New York University on a scholarship, earning a degree in computer science. In May 1980, he married his childhood sweetheart, Linda. Ruffo initially worked for United Computer Systems LLC in New York, before eventually branching out to form his own firm, Consolidated Computer Services (CCS).

Criminal case
Ruffo became acquainted with and befriended another prominent New York businessman, Edward J. Reiners, formerly an executive with Philip Morris USA. After Reiners was laid off, he approached Ruffo with an idea in 1992. The scheme involved soliciting various banks in an attempt to secure financing for a fictitious "Project Star". They pitched the project to bank executives as a top secret operation for Phillip Morris to develop smokeless cigarettes. Ruffo's company, CCS, was to provide the computer hardware and consulting for five offices set up to work on the project. They leveraged Reiners' prior credentials as a Phillip Morris executive to forge documents and add authenticity to the scheme. They also included stringent confidentiality agreements stipulating that because of the sensitivity of the project, banks were to deal only with Reiners and to never contact Phillip Morris directly.

Ruffo tried to avoid suspicion by making timely interest payments on the loans. However, in 1996 a bank executive at the Long-Term Credit Bank of Japan noticed an irregularity on one of the forged documents. After he contacted Phillip Morris and then the FBI, the scheme began to unravel. Reiners was arrested by FBI agents who set up a sting operation on March 19, 1996, and an arrest warrant was issued for Ruffo two weeks later. All told the scheme generated over US $350 million in secured loans (equivalent to $ million in ), although much of it was squandered in poor stock market speculation and exorbitant spending habits on the part of the conspirators. US$21 million (equivalent to $ million in ) was, however, never accounted for by federal authorities.

Ruffo faced a 150-count indictment charging him with bank fraud, money laundering, wire fraud, and conspiracy. His bail was set at an unusually high $10 million as he was considered a flight risk. As nearly all of Ruffo's known assets and accounts were frozen by the FBI, most of his immediate family put up their homes as collateral to secure his pre-trial release. Ruffo was found guilty on all counts and was sentenced to 17 years in prison.

Fugitive

In November 1998, Ruffo failed to turn himself over to the U.S. Marshals Service to begin serving his sentence. His image was captured on CCTV cameras taking money out of an ATM (pictured) on the afternoon he was to report, but he has not been seen nor heard from since. In his wife's last communication with him on the morning of his disappearance, he told her he was meeting with a parole officer but never returned. His car was later recovered by the FBI abandoned at JFK Airport. Three months after Ruffo's disappearance, the homes of his wife, mother, mother-in-law, and others were seized by the government as a forfeiture of bond collateral, effectively making them all homeless.

In April 2001, Ruffo was sighted in Duncan, Oklahoma, apparently visiting several community banks in an attempt to open an account so he could receive US$250 million of wire transfers from Nigeria. But when authorities went to capture him in Duncan, Ruffo had already left town. Later that year, his wife Linda filed for divorce, citing spousal abandonment, which was granted.

Authorities believe Ruffo still has access to substantial overseas financial resources, which could be aiding him in his ability to stay off-the-grid and assume a new identity. Chief Deputy US Marshal John Bolen commented in 2013, "Having been sentenced to 220 months of incarceration and not serving a single day of that kind of sticks in the craw of those of us in this profession. His actions are a mockery to our justice system. We are the best in the world at this. He just has to make one mistake. We can make many but he just has to make one. We'll catch him". Ruffo's last attorney, Jeffery Lichtman, offered the following when asked if he thought authorities would ever capture his former client: "I think if I had to be a betting man, I'd put my money on John Ruffo. Because from what I can see so far, he is smarter than the people looking for him."

Ruffo's cousin, Carmine Pascale, believed that he spotted Ruffo in the stands in Dodger Stadium while watching a Los Angeles Dodgers game on television on August 5, 2016. He froze his screen and contacted police. With the help of the Dodgers, police found the seat number and tracked down the ticket holder. However, the holder had given the ticket away. It had changed hands many times and the man who attended the game could not be found. After months of no new leads, the information was made publicly available in October 2021. An image of the man suspected of being Ruffo was released shortly afterwards. Investigator Danielle Shimchick said that the person in the image closely resembles Ruffo, and Pascale remained convinced that it was him. After the image was released, law enforcement got a tip and were able to track down the man seen in the images. Through fingerprints and a swift background check, they confirmed the man seen at the game was not Ruffo.

Ruffo remains at large. The U.S. Marshals Service is offering a $25,000 reward for information that leads to the capture of John Ruffo.

See also
Financial crimes
List of fugitives from justice who disappeared
Taylor, Bean & Whitaker, former top tier mortgage firm who ceased all operations in 2009 due to bank fraud and financial crimes.

References

External links

John Ruffo at the US Marshals Service

1954 births
20th-century American businesspeople
American businesspeople convicted of crimes
American confidence tricksters
American money launderers
American white-collar criminals
Businesspeople from Brooklyn
Businesspeople from Queens, New York
Forgers
Fugitives
Fugitives wanted by the United States
Living people
People from Forest Hills, Queens